Bushkill or Bush Kill may refer to the following geographical locations in the United States:

Communities
Bushkill, Pennsylvania
Bushkill Center, Pennsylvania
Bushkill Township, Northampton County, Pennsylvania

Streams
Big Bushkill Creek in Pennsylvania
Little Bush Kill, a tributary of the above creek
Bush Kill (Esopus Creek), a tributary of Esopus Creek in New York
Bush Kill (New York), a stream that flows into Dry Brook near Arkville
Bushkill Creek, a tributary of the Delaware River in Pennsylvania
Bushkill Brook, a tributary of the South Branch Raritan River in New Jersey

Other water features
Bushkill Falls
Bushkill Swamp

See also